Femicide or feminicide is a hate crime which is broadly defined as "the intentional killing of women or girls because they are female," but definitions of it vary depending on cultural context. In 1976, the feminist author Diana E. H. Russell first defined the term as "the killing of females by males because they are female." In some Central American countries the term femicide is used in reference to the violent killings of women and girls which are frequently perpetrated by gang members in order to stoke fear and compliance among civilians.

A spouse or partner is responsible in almost 40% of homicides involving a female victim. In addition, femicide may be underreported. Femicide often includes domestic violence and forced or sex-selective abortions.

Androcide refers the violence or killing of men. Gendercide may refer to gender specific violence more generally.

History

Development of the term 
The term femicide was first used in England in 1801 to signify "the killing of a woman". In 1848, the term was published in Wharton's Law Lexicon. The term stems from the Latin femina, meaning "female" and -cide from the Latin "caedere" meaning "to kill".

The current usage emerged with the 1970s feminist movements, which aimed to raise feminine consciousness and resistance against gender oppression. The term has been used to call attention to violence against women. American author Carol Orlock is widely credited with initiating this usage of the term in her unpublished anthology on femicide. 

Diana Russell publicized the term at the Crimes Against Women Tribunal in 1976 at the first International Tribunal on Crimes against Women in Belgium. She wrote: "We must realize that a lot of homicide is femicide. We must recognize the sexual politics of murder. From the burning of witches in the past, to the more recent widespread custom of female infanticide in many societies, to the killing of women for 'honor,' we realize that femicide has been going on a long time. But since it involves mere females, there was no name for it until Carol Orlock invented the word 'femicide. Femicide remains understudied in scientific literature. 

Femicide may also be 'intimate.' Intimate femicide can be identified as such by using the "severity of violence, such as access to and threats with firearms, forced sex, threats to kill, and strangulation" to determine whether a case can be considered an act of femicide or not. The definition of femicide also relies on "inequalities in gender 'in terms of education, economic level, and employment'".

Contemporary definition by feminists 
Feminist author Diana Russell narrows the definition of femicide to "the killing of females by males because they are female". Russell emphasizes that males commit femicide with sexist motives. She replaces "woman" with "female" to include girls and infants. Russell believes her definition of femicide applies to all forms of sexist killing, whether motivated by misogyny (the hatred of females), a sense of superiority over females, sexual pleasure, or the assumption of ownership over women. 

Russell says: "Femicide is on the extreme end of a continuum of antifemale terror that includes a wide variety of verbal and physical abuse, such as rape, torture, sexual slavery (particularly in prostitution), incestuous and extrafamilial child sexual abuse, physical and emotional battery, sexual harassment (on the phone, in the streets, at the office, and in the classroom), genital mutilation (clitoridectomies, excision, infibulations), unnecessary gynecological operations (gratuitous hysterectomies), forced heterosexuality, forced sterilization, forced motherhood (by criminalizing contraception and abortion), psychosurgery, denial of food to women in some cultures, cosmetic surgery, and other mutilations in the name of beautification. Whenever these forms of terrorism result in death, they become femicides."

She includes covert killings of women as well, such as the mass murder of female babies or sex selecttive abortions due to male preference in cultures such as India and China, as well as deaths related to the failure of social institutions, such as the criminalization of abortion or the prevalence of female genital mutilation.

Other definitions 
Diana Russell's definition is not accepted by all scholars. Jacquelyn Campbell and Carol Runyan use "femicide" to reference "all killings of women, regardless of motive or perpetrator status" They argue that motive cannot always be determined, and so must be removed from the qualification for femicide to gather data.

Feminists Desmond Ellis and Walter Dekesedery take a different approach, viewing the definition of femicide as "the intentional killing of females by males". They require that femicide be intentional, unlike the inclusion of covert femicide in Diana Russell's definition. Femicides are also identified "as 'slip-ups' in a power struggle in which men strive to control women and deprive them of their liberty and women struggle for autonomy".

South Asian feminists differ, stating that femicide is "the intentional killing of females by men, and of females by other females in the interests of men". Examples include neglect of female children in preference of males as well as dowry-related murder, where female in-laws kill women due to dowry disputes. Moreover, COST Action 1206 provides definitions of femicide.

These definitions distinguish femicide from non-gendered descriptions of murder and homicide. Instead, femicide exemplifies that women are killed for different reasons and motives from those associated with typical descriptions of murder. Globally, femicide has seldom been investigated separately from homicide, and the goal of many of these authors is to make femicide a separate category. In 2013, COST set up Action IS-1206 entitled "Femicide across Europe".

Causes 
Defined by Diana Russell, femicide includes intimate partner femicide, lesbicide, racial femicide, serial femicide, mass femicide, honor killing related femicide, dowry and more. Any act of sexual terrorism that results in death is considered femicide. Covert femicide also takes form in the criminalization of abortion in cases where the mother's life is at risk, intentional spread of HIV/AIDS, or death as a result of female genital mutilation.

The most widespread form of femicide in the world is that committed by an intimate partner of a female. This accounts for almost 40% of all murders of women globally and may be an undercount.

Different areas of the world experience femicide varyingly, i.e., the Middle East and South Asia have higher rates of honor killing: the murder of women by their family, due to an actual or assumed sexual or behavioral transgression, such as adultery, sexual intercourse, or even having been raped.

Among intimate partners 
Intimate partner femicide, sometimes called intimate femicide, or romantic femicide, refers to "the killing of a woman by her intimate partner or her former intimate partner". These can include former or current boyfriends, husbands, and common-law husbands.

5-8% of all murders committed by male perpetrators are cases of intimate partner homicide. For example, an examination from media and internet sources of every single murder of an elderly woman committed between 2006 and 2015 revealed that all the cases of female geronticide in Israel were exclusively intimate partner femicides, and perpetrated in the domestic arena.

Acts of incest, sexual harassment, rape, battering, and other forms of violence are also found to escalate over time within a familial relationship, possibly resulting in femicide. The prevalence of intimate partner femicide is said to dispel the myth that women have the most to fear from strangers, and instead are most often killed within the private sphere of the home. Argued by Jacquelyn Campbell, a common motive that causes men to kill their intimate partners is jealousy, a result of male efforts to control and possess women to display ownership and reinforce patriarchy.

A "feminist reconceptualization"  claims a structural system is to blame for the murder of women rather than violent individuals. It is cross-cultural structure on a mass scale, and is suggested to be considered as a human rights violation by the Women's Studies International Forum and considered a "crime against humanity." While authors acknowledge "crimes are committed by individuals and not by abstract entities", the prevalence of domestic violence constitutes an epidemic. Contemporary feminists believe that re-framing intimate partner violence as a state crime and a crime against humanity can help reduce violence against women committed by their significant others, as it is already recognized as a violation of the international human rights law. 

There is considerable debate over whether men or women are more likely to commit intimate violence with studies from the US and UK finding large variations across race, age, and income. However abuse resulting in police action are largely committed by men against women.

Risk factors that increase the likelihood of intimate partner femicide include: when a male suffered physical abuse as a child, when a male has previously threatened to commit suicide or kill the woman if she cheats on him or leaves him, when there is elevated alcohol or drug abuse by either partner, or when a male attempts to control a woman's freedom. Two-fifths of intimate partner femicide is related to the use of intoxicants. 

Other factors commonly associated with male perpetrators of femicide include gun ownership, forcing sexual intercourse, and unemployment. Women's risk factors include: if they are pregnant, have faced prior abuse from their partner, are estranged from their partner, or are attempting to leave a relationship, their likelihood of femicide increases. The presence of firearms within a home is a large factor in intimate partner femicide, and worldwide, firearms are used in one-third of all femicides.

As often reported in the public eye, male perpetrators are seen as "being driven" to commit femicide, due to a "breakdown in love attributed to the female". In defense trials, the defense of provocation is often used to reduce the time male killers serve in prison. Conversely, women are not often as successful with using this idea of provocation in their murder trials, and judges are statistically less likely to accept claims of self-defense.

Factors that decrease the risk of intimate partner femicide include a separate domicile for women and other societal factors, such as better policing, as well as mandated arrest for violation of restraining orders related to intimate partner violence. Karen D. Stout found that, in the US, there is a correlation between the number of women's shelters in a state, the number of rape crisis centers, and a lowered rate of femicide. One explanation of this correlation is that implementing these measures has positively affected lowering the femicide rate. Other effective legislation against femicide include legislation that defines civil injunction relief, defines physical abuse as a criminal offense', allows arrest without a warrant, requires data collection and reporting, and provides funds for women's shelters.

Gun violence 
There has been an increase in the amount of femicides linked to intimate partner violence. In the US, about 67% of the women killed by their partners are killed with a gun. Access to guns therefore plays an important role in this. On average, 70 American women are "shot and killed" by their intimate partner every month.

Racially motivated 
The Hope Movement defines racist femicide as the racially motivated killing of women by men who are members of a different race. According to Diana Russell and fellow writer Jill Radford, "Racism interacts with violence against women, and shapes both femicide itself, and the ways it is addressed by the local community, the police, the media, and the legal system."
Russell and Radford assert that when looking at femicide within the United States specifically, one must consider the politics of both sexism and racism in the murders of black women and the little justice that is often served. 

Media coverage can especially exhibit bias when covering the murders of Black versus white women. Jaime Grant writes on the murder of 12 young women in Boston, Massachusetts, and exposes the "racism in media coverage, which virtually ignored these killings initially, and later depicted the victims in racist and sexist stereotypes, such as runaways, drug addicts, or prostitutes." In addition, police response and investigation can often differ based on the victim's race.

Engaging in work with Black Feminist Studies, author Manshel claims that the narrative which is formed around domestic violence is traditionally associated with a white, middle class, female victim, leaves victims of different races and social classes to receive unequal care, and it can also lead to more victimization of the woman who is murdered/abused due to not aligning with the vulnerability which is typically expected of female victims. Manshel also traces the history of assaults of Black women, and she makes the distinction that "the circumstances" of white victims were "wholly different" from those of "enslaved women" in the 19-20th century, and she proposes that anti-racist frameworks about sexual violence should be put into writing.

Sexually motivated (homophobic) 
According to Diana Russell and Jill Radford, lesbicide, also known as homophobic femicide, has a long history of legalized murder of lesbians in many different cultural contexts:
 Roman civilization: a married woman convicted of engaging in any sexual activity with another woman could be killed by her husband as a "just penalty for her crime".
 Medieval Europe: secular and religious doctrine mandated death for lesbianism. "The famous 1260 Code of Orleans in France secularized the prohibition of lesbianism, mandating that for the first two offenses, a woman would 'lose her member'; for the third offense she would be burned."
 Witch-hunt of the 15th century: Witchcraft was linked with heresy and homosexuality. The phrase femina cum feminus (woman with woman) was often an accusation in witch trials.

Today, lesbianism is no longer a capital crime, but it remains criminalized by many governments, and is condemned by most religions. Torture and murder of lesbians occurs in every part of the world. According to Dr. Susan Hawthorne of Victoria University, "domination is exemplified in the punishment of lesbians as outsiders in patriarchal culture" Dr. Hawthorne goes on to elaborate that lesbians are often killed, tortured, or generally denied rights, due to their invisibility in terms of political power and social representation: "When it comes to campaigns on violence against women, lesbians are either left out or included only in a footnote".

A case study conducted in 2014 deeply analyzing multiple anti-LGBT cases of violence suggests that crimes like lesbicide can at least, in part, be explained by existing hyper-masculinity theories that observe the "accomplishment of gender" and that "constructing masculinity is relevant to bias crime offending". One common occurrence that sociological researchers have found is the escalation of violence towards LGBT members when they were met with "unwanted heterosexual advances". The community agrees that violent crimes and homicides are heterogeneous phenomenons.

Corrective rape 
According to political scientist and women's studies scholar Susan Hawthorne, corrective rape is a hate crime that constitutes forced sexual activity with a person who is either a woman, gender non-conforming, or identifies as a lesbian. The goal of corrective rape is to "correct" the victim's sexual orientation and make them heterosexual or behave in a more gender-conforming manner. This has led to death in some cases. There are documented cases of corrective rape in South Africa, Zimbabwe, Ecuador, and Thailand. 

Eudy Simelane was a famous soccer player who played for the South Africa women's national football team and LGBTQ+ rights activist; her murder was a highly publicized instance of simultaneous corrective rape and lesbicide in South Africa.

Tendency in serial killings 
Serial femicide is defined as "the sexually sadistic killing of women", also called "sexual terrorism". Although over 90% of serial killers are male.

Male serial murderers tend to use more brutal methods of killing, such as suffocation and beatings. In contrast, women use poison or less violent measures. In addition, while a large percentage of male serial killers focus on women as their targets, female serial killers are less likely to focus exclusively on males. Some male serial killers focus on males as targets, such as Jeffrey Dahmer and Wayne Williams. The ways serial murderers are portrayed in the media reflect the views on femicide and gender in society. Often, murders of prostitutes, low-income women, and women of color by serial killers receive less attention in the media than the killings of younger, prettier, more affluent women, usually married, engaged, or in relationships with much handsome, affluent, younger men their age.

According to the FBI's Supplementary Homicide Report, local police reported that about 33,000 homicides of women remain unsolved.

Feminists such as Diana Russell and Jane Caputi believe in a link between the rise of serial murders and the advent of pornography. Specifically, the advent of films that eroticize violence and murder of women has been correlated to the desires of serial killers. Numerous serial murderers filmed their victims as they violently killed them. However, the link between pornography and serial murders is not proven.

Female infanticide 
Female infanticide is the killing of female infants. It is found all over the world regardless of a country's sophistication. A common misconception is that it is only related to abortions, but it also includes "girl-child murders". Female infanticide plays an important role in the imbalance of gender populations. In countries where female infanticide is practiced, the male populations is higher than the female population.

Worldwide 
Every year, an average of 66,000 women are violently killed globally, accounting for approximately 17% of all victims of intentional homicides. In
2017, 87,000 women and girls were killed globally. This means that 238 women are killed daily. According to a 2000 report by the U.N. Population Fund (UNFPA), approximately 5,000 women are murdered each year in honor killings. The rates of femicide differ depending on the specific country, but of the countries with the top 25 highest femicide rates, 50% are in Latin America, with number one being El Salvador. Also included in the top 25 are seven European countries, three Asian countries, and one African country, South Africa. In a UN study, 1 in 4 women in the top 25 countries agreed that it was justifiable to be beaten or hit for arguing with their husband, or refusing to have sex with him. 

Data on femicide worldwide is poor, and often countries do not report gender differences in murder statistics. In addition, reporting data on migrants is particularly scarce.

Africa 
The continent varies in the manifestations of femicide depending on the country or region. Some Muslim women become a commodity in the fight between two factions and are killed when one faction (dis)approves of the wearing of the prescribed traditional dress.[14]

One of the biggest health problems in Africa is the epidemic of HIV/AIDS which affects 25.7 million people in Sub-Saharan Africa as of 2017. Whenever AIDS results in the death of a female due to misogyny or sexist male behavior, it is considered a form of femicide according to Diana Russell's definition of femicide.

Female genital mutilation is defined by the World Health Organization as "the removal of part or all of the external female genitalia and/or injury to the female genetic organs for cultural or other non-therapeutic reasons". Female genital mutilation results in femicide when women and girls die, due to unhygienic practices of FGM that result in infection or death, as well as the increased likelihood of contracting HIV/AIDS because of FGM.

Cases of femicide have been common in the Middle East and North Africa region. In June 2022 Nayera Ashraf refused the advances of a man and was stabbed to death by him publicly in broad daylight. The incident sparked widespread outrage amongst social media users about growing cases of femicide, after the video of the stabbing outside Nayera's university went viral online. Whereas, Egyptian preacher and controversial TV presenter Mabrouk Attia, garnered criticism for suggesting women cover and remain veiled when stepping outside to avoid being subjected to such unfortunate incidents. As a result, social media users spurred a campaign demanding Attia's arrest.

Asia

Japan 
Japan has one of the highest rates of female homicide victims in the world, as a percentage of total homicides. According to a report by the U.N. Office on Drugs and Crime (UNODC), published in 2014, Japan, together with Hong Kong, top the ranking — with women comprising 52.9% of the total homicide victims — followed by South Korea at 52.5%.

In addition, all accomplished homicide cases in 2021 included 54.9% of cases by family members, 8.6% by spouses or partners, 27.2% by acquaintances, 6.9% by strangers. Thus the rates of filicide(siblicide, fratricide, sororicide, matricide) are regarded higher than the statistics because of Japan jurisdictions' prosecutorial discretion system without preliminary hearing.

India 

Rita Banerji, feminist author and founder of The 50 Million Missing Campaign to end female gendercide in India, has said that there are also millions of girls and women killed through various forms of femicides that extend across various age groups. In a U.N. Symposium on Femicide  in Vienna on 26 November 2012, she talked about the six most widespread forms of femicide in India. These included female infanticide, the killing of girls under six years through starvation and violence, the killing of women due to forced abortions, honor killings, dowry murders, and witch lynchings. 

Many of the femicides in India are perpetrated against girls.
Despite progressive legal reforms in many parts of the country, strong patriarchal values are maintained, and help perpetuate the subordination of women. According to the Special Rapporteur on violence against women for the Human Rights Council, key factors behind gender-motivated killings of women in Asia are the high level of importance placed on women's chastity and their subordination in the greater society. For example, while the Penal Code of India now specifically prohibits dowry, the reported number of dowry-related deaths of women has almost doubled from 4,836 to 8,383 over the past twenty years (1990–2009). The code is also criticized for having a low impact on the criminalization of perpetrators, noted in the low conviction rate of ten percent.

The country has attempted to manage femicide through some policy enactment. India has primarily focused on creating legislation related to population control, resulting in pressures to have a son. Some regions in India have incentivized parents to birth daughters by offering money to families with girls, in order to offset the expenses associated with having a daughter. However, there have been research studies analysing femicide policy, specifically in relation to India, that have found "the criminalization of sex selection has not been successful".

Nepal

Suicide is the leading cause of death for Nepalese women in the reproductive age group, with causes ranging from domestic abuse, forced marriage, casting out of widows, and lack of property rights. In this context, there is minimal acceptance and respect of young girls and women, and often an absence of family support. This results in a variety of context-specific versions of femicide and gender-based violence in the region: honor killings, acid attacks, witch-hunting, foeticide, and gender-based violence during caste and communal conflict.

China 

Female infanticide was common in traditional China, where natural hardships such as famines reinforced cultural norms favoring sons, and encouraged hard-pressed families to abandon or kill their infant daughters. Furthermore, daughters became liabilities, as gender was also crucial to the system of ancestor worship, in which only sons were allowed to carry out ritual sacrifices. Thus, "if a couple failed to produce a son, its crucial links to the past and future were broken".

In present-day China, despite official condemnation and outrage, female infanticide continues. In late 1982, the Chinese press was the first to indicate that female infanticide was being practiced as the final option to circumvent the one-child policy. An expert from the City University of New York, however, disagrees with the tendency to characterize female infanticide as "the unfortunate consequence of Chinese population control and modernization policies". She defines female infanticide as "part of a crime of gender", which she refers to as "social femicide", and relates it to the broader problem of gender inequality in Chinese society.

Turkey 

A gender-based discriminatory notion of honor is sometimes the cause of serious cases of health deterioration or mutilation among women in Turkey. According to the Report on Custom and Honor Killings by the country's General Directorate of Security, 1,028 custom and honor killings were committed between the years of 2003 and 2007. It is important, however, that according to the World Data Bank, femicide rates in Turkey were 0.9 women killed due to violence against women per 100k women. Which ranks it about the same femicide rate as Istanbul-convention ratifiers such as Germany & Austria, but still significantly higher than most of the other ratifiers. Since 2019, Turkeys femicide rate have seen a significant drop of 44.9%.

According to the data of the General Directorate of Security covering killings in Turkey until 2007, honor killings happen predominantly in the Southeastern part of the country. The rates of murderers born in Eastern and Southeastern Anatolia are much higher than murderers born in other regions. With 24% of the murderers born in Southeastern Anatolia and 21% in Eastern Anatolia, they share the top spot. While in comparison, only 8% of the murderers are born in the Marmara region. Even though that region has the highest rate of honor killings, which means that the killings are primarily committed by people born outside that region. The reason behind this is the fact that honor killings are still receiving support in Eastern and Southeastern Anatolia. According to a survey in Diyarbakir, a city in Southeastern Anatolia, 40% of the respondents supported honor killing. In some court cases this has led the court to decide to send the entire family to prison. For example, in 2009, an entire Kurdish family was sent to prison for life, because they were involved in the honor killing of their daughter, who got pregnant after being raped.

In 2020, 300 women died as a result of femicide in Turkey, which is 174 (36%) less than the year before It is important to note that the source started differentiating between confirmed femicides and suspicious deaths in 2020, so the more representative numbers to compare are: 474 in 2019 and 471 in 2020, a decrease of about 0,5% . According to the same source, suspicious deaths have been rising for the past years. Totaling the numbers from confirmed and suspicious deaths in 2021 497 have been killed, in 2020 471 have been killed and in 2019 474 have been killed.

In March 2021, via presidential decree, the Turkish government made the decision to leave the Istanbul convention, making it the first and only country in the Council of Europe to have withdrawn from any international human rights convention. This has sparked outrage in the population, as according to polls, only 26% of the population voted in favor of leaving. In the past the president has stated, that the women's rights movement is diverting women from their original roles as mothers and wives, while also normalizing tolerance to homosexuality. National women's rights organizations, who had been criticizing lack of implementation of the convention for years, now have concerns about rising femicide rates in Turkey.

South Korea 
In South Korea, violence towards women has been increasing. In 2012, a man named Oh Won-choon killed a woman while attempting to sexually assault her while going home. In 2014, while waiting for a bus, a woman was stabbed to death by a drunk man. Then in 2016, a 34-year-old whose surname is Kim randomly murdered a woman in her twenties in a Gangnam Station bathroom. Regarding motives, Kim clearly stated that he murdered her out of hatred for women saying: “women have always ignored me.” 

The rise in violence towards women has made women fearful. In 2019, The South Korean government released the 2019 Domestic Violence Survey Study that found that only 27.6 percent of women over the age of 13 feel society is safe for them. The study also found that women accounted for 98 percent of victims in intimate partner femicide (domestic violence) cases. In 2019 32,000 sex crimes against women were reported; that is 12,000 more cases than in 2010. All the while domestic violence cases have reached 50,000 in 2019 compared to 6,800 cases in 2011.

While these numbers may not be completely accurate; it is estimated that there are more femicide, and intimate partner femicide cases not being reported due to Confucianist influences on South Korean society. Confucianism believes women should be subordinate to men and assumes women's status as inferior from men. These values also hold that women have only three roles: Daughter, wife, and mother and that women must obey the head of the family, that is to say her father before marriage and her husband after marriage. South Korea’s traditional patriarchal culture and values  assign strict roles to female members, as well as their strong belief that a woman's place should be with her family no matter what, cause women to be wary of reporting violence towards them due to fear of bringing shame to the family or affecting the family’ social status.

In a study focusing on the experiences of 14 female victims of intimate partner femicide in getting help with domestic violence found that victims didn't talk to their family or sought them out for support. Only one participant escaped their abusive relationship because their parents saw the bruises and called the police. Victims were scared to talk to their families. They were scared that their parents would get angry and be saddened by seeing their daughters get abused. Additionally, it is also taboo for women to talk about their romantic relationships with their parents.

In the study, four victims chose the police as a support to escape their abuser. They decided to call the police when the relationship became a risk for their health. Two out of the four victims shared their negative experiences with the police. The police refused to get involved because they thought that what they were experiencing were normal relationship conflicts. These victims saw that current laws in South Korea are inadequate for protecting them from domestic femicide victims. They were deeply frustrated about it and they felt anxious and scared since they felt no one could protect them.

The legal system does not favor women suffering from femicide and intimate partner femicide. Victims find it hard to report an aggressive male behavior, domestic partner violence, and violence towards women due to the idea that sexual assault and domestic violence is a matter that should be handled “privately”. In South Korea two legislations that protected women were enacted for the first time in 1997. “Special Action Punishment of Domestic Violence Crimes” legislation was established to punish the perpetrators. This law states if someone is found to be guilty of psychological, mental and physical violence the perpetrator will be fined or face jail time. The “Act on Prevention of Domestic Violence and Protection of Victims” legislation is used to protect the victims by reporting systems, provision of protection facilities and support services for victims. Even though this law protects victims it is limited since it only protects married couples and does not address couples who are not married and face intimate partner violence.

Olivia Shieber, a senior program manager of foreign and defense policy studies, describes Korean courts as lenient with sex crime punishments. In 2013, the Korean Supreme court upheld the country’s first spousal rape conviction which is something in which South Korea was lagging behind when compared to other first world countries and it wasn't until the year 202 when the age of consent was raised from 13 to 16. Additionally, the fact that just 30% of judges and less than 4% of police personnel are women clearly affects how crimes of this sort are handled by the Korean judicial system. Even in cases where prosecutors successfully prosecute a defendant for a sex offense, the offenders are usually given a suspended sentence. Additionally, due to the country's strict legal definitions, it is still challenging to prove rape and other sex crimes in South Korea and some defendants have even exploited South Korea’s tough defamation laws to sue their alleged victims for defamation making victims scared to come forward. Ultimately, women that face intimate partner violence or femicide in Korea are left feeling isolated and disenfranchised, neglected by the legal system and socially outcast while having to increasingly worry about femicide rates rising.

Australia 
In 2019, a recent statistic from the Australian Institute of Criminology indicated that on average, one woman a week is murdered in an act of femicide in Australia.

Europe 

In Europe, agencies have funded initiatives on gender and violence but not specifically on femicide. Research is in its infancy and uncoordinated. A COST Action IS1206 has established the first pan-European coalition on femicide with researchers who are already studying the phenomenon nationally to advance research clarity, agree on definitions, improve the efficacy of policies for femicide prevention, and publish guidelines for the use of national policy-makers. EU reports show that additional support has been needed during the period of pandemic lockdown in many countries 

Available data are limited: Eurostat covers only 20 countries and there are discrepancies in the way in which the data is collected. According to available data in Western Europe, the average annual rate is 0.4 victims of femicide for every 100,000 women. The worst situations are found in Montenegro, Lithuania, and Latvia. In most countries, the partner is the most common perpetrator. However, there are exceptions: in Lithuania and Bosnia and Herzegovina, most femicides are committed by family members. Also, while male victims of homicide have been in a sharp decline in recent years, the number of women murdered in Europe, not necessarily at the hands of a partner or family member, remains constant, with a slight increase from 2013 to 2015. From 2013 to 2017, 30 European countries joined a COST (Cooperation on Science and Technology) project called "femicide across Europe.

The European Union first enacted COST (Cooperation on Science and Technology), a program known as COST Action. COST Action led to four different femicide research groups: definitions, data collection, cultural issues, and advocacy and prevention. Thirty countries signed a Memorandum of Understanding with COST that promoted international efforts to address femicide and the Action program. The Istanbul Convention was a gathering of multiple independent states who had a common goal of acknowledging and addressing femicide. However, the convention "is not a treaty, and not legally binding for all states", and thus is not an official policy.

France 
Depending on the sources, between 122 and 149 women were killed in France in 2019 by their partners or ex-partners.

Germany 
Germany has one of the highest absolute femicide numbers in Europe.

Italy
Statistics of femicide in Italy are reported by year (1995-2019) by the independent Women NGO .

Spain
Statistics and structure of femicide in Spain are reported by year (2010-2019).

Switzerland
In Switzerland, a woman is murdered by her male partner an average of every 15 days.

United Kingdom 

Interest in reporting and analyzing levels of femicide in the United Kingdom has grown in recent years, and several national organizations provide support  In 2021, a campaign began in the UK led by The Observer and the Femicide Census to better identify femicide, to improve the knowledge of it, and to encourage improved methods to end it. This included raising awareness of the data produced by the Femicide Census  The organisation, led by Karen Ingala Smith and Clarrie O'Callaghan, justifies it as bringing data together in this way "significantly improves upon currently available data by providing detailed comparable data about femicides in the UK since 2009, including demographic and social factors and the methods men selected to kill women. By collating femicides, we can see that these killings are not isolated incidents, and many follow repeated patterns." By taking an intersectional approach to the data campaigners, academics and journalists are able to highlight patterns of concern, such as the numbers of older women being killed, those killed by partners and ex-lovers, or those killed during lockdown. On average, in the UK, a woman is killed by a man every three days, or by a current or former partner, every four days. The data is not gathered in Scotland. Data published in 2022 shows that in year ending March 2021, 177 women were murdered in England and Wales( for comparison, 416 men were killed in this period). Where there was a known suspect, 92% of the women were killed by men.

Latin America 

Feminists in Latin America have been among the first to adopt the term femicide, referring to the female homicides in Ciudad Juárez, Mexico. This term inspired feminists in Latin America to organize anti-femicide groups to challenge this social injustice towards women. The use of the term femicide, and the creation of anti-femicide feminist organizations, spread from Mexico, to many other Latin American countries, like Guatemala. In Latin America, femicide is an issue that occurs in many countries, but most predominantly in Central America, in countries such as El Salvador and Honduras, and other places, such as Brazil and Mexico. The Latin American region includes 5 of the 12 countries with the highest rate of femicide in the world. According to Julia Estela Monárrez-Fragoso of the Colegio de la Frontera Norte based in Ciudad Juárez, victims are often blamed for being out late at night, or for hanging around "questionable" areas, such as discotecas or nightclubs. Between 2000 and 2010, more than five thousand Guatemalan women and girls were murdered. Guatemala's historical record reveals a long history of acceptance of gendered violence, and the military, government, and judiciary's role in normalizing misogyny. In a Report on the Violations of Women's Rights in Guatemala by a United Nations Human Rights Committee, the state's failure to enforce laws protecting women from femicide is seen as highly problematic. The report argues that enforcing laws against the murder of women is a low priority of state governments, due to patriarchal beliefs, and assumptions about the role of women in society.

Various activists and scholars, such as Monárrez, have argued that connections exist between the femicides and neoliberal policies, namely North American Free Trade Agreement (NAFTA). They believe that the treaty has served to open trade borders, and to increase foreign investment targeted at manufacturing low-cost garments in maquiladoras.

Intimate partner femicide is the most common form of femicide, and high violence and crime rates in these countries also contribute to this issue. There is a lack of an organized system to record information and statistical data to support this issue. Machismo, a history of civil wars, and other cultural influences can also contribute to this issue, specifically in Latin America. Torture, mutilation, defacement, sexual assault, and the dumping of bodies is a common trend with femicide.

It has been observed that many of the women killed in Ciudad Juárez are young mothers who migrate to this region seeking employment in maquiladoras. They then become easy targets, due to the fact that they are separated from their family, and are typically alone when traveling home. Policy solutions in Central America have tried making transportation safer (see below for policy solutions). Other scholars, such as Itallurde, point to the culpability of corporations "based on the concepts and doctrines of tortuous negligence, failure to protect, and aiding and abetting". Other scholars, such as historians Steven Volk and Marian Schlotterbeck, hypothesize that there may be a "macho backlash" behind these killings: "Certainly male egos, of fathers and would-be boyfriends, must suffer some deflation from this dramatic change in the economic influence of these young women."

In 2015, Mexican Supreme Court required the police to reopen and investigate a murder case from a femicide "perspective".

However, there have been some actions taken to address this issue. The criminalization of femicide and various laws passed in specific countries have aimed to stop this problem. In addition, the United Nations has taken a role in stopping this with a commission that calls for action to be taken. There is a growing social awareness around this issue with #NiUnaMenos (Not One Woman Less) or #NiUnaMas (Not One More Woman). Lastly, female friendly urban zones have been created as a concrete solution. These zones include female-only transportation, and government centers offering services specifically for women.

Central American policymakers have experimented with creating "female-friendly urban zones" over the past decade. "Pink" public transportation networks have been established in Mexico, Brazil, El Salvador, and Guatemala to provide women-only forms of public transportation to stem sexual harassment, and to provide safety for women. These efforts have received substantial praise and criticism.

Criticism from feminists and others often point to the efficacy of gender segregation in changing gender norms of oppression - specifically the Latin American cultural conventions of "machismo" and "marianismo", which are potent social regulators throughout the region.

Mexico

Amnesty International estimates that there have been around 34,000 female homicides in Mexico between 1986 and 2009. According to the National Citizen Observatory on Femicide, only 49 percent of the 800 cases of women killed in Mexico between June and July 2017 were investigated as femicide. In 2018, "93 percent of crimes were either not reported or not investigated." One activist, Natalia Reyes, reported that only 8 percent of femicides in Mexico are punished. Almost 35,000 people were murdered in 2019, Mexico's most violent year on record. Additionally, in 2012, Mexico was ranked as the 16th country in the world with the highest rates of femicides. In August 2021, a total of 108 femicides occurred in Mexico, the highest since 2019.

In 2016, Mexico had a rate of female homicides of 4.6 femicides per 100,000, and there were a total of 2,746 female deaths with the presumption of homicide, but that has more than doubled in the past 5 years. On average, about 10 women are killed everyday. In this year, the top three states with the highest rates of female deaths with the presumption of homicide were Colima (with 16.3 deaths per 100,000 women), Guerrero (13.1 per 100,000), and Zacatecas (9.7 per 100,000). The top three municipalities in 2016 were Acapulco de Juárez (24.22 per 100,000), Tijuana (10.84 per 100,000), and Juárez (10.36 per 100,000). During the years 2002–2010, the state of Chihuahua had the highest rate of female homicides in the world: 58.4 per 100,000. The rates of femicide in the municipality of Juárez have decreased significantly in just five years; in 2011, the rate of female deaths with the presumption of homicides was 31.49 per 100,000, and by 2016 it had decreased to 10.36 per 100,000.

There has been large demonstrations in Mexico against femicides; however, most took place after 11 February 2020. This was the day seven-year old Fatima Cecilia was kidnapped from school. She was found dead in a plastic bag a couple of days later. A movement called "Un Dia Sin Mujeres" (a day without women) spread all over the country right after Fatima's murder.

Brazil
Femicide is a crime provided for in the Brazilian Penal Code, item VI, paragraph 2, of art. 121, when committed "against a woman on grounds of female condition". The Paragraph 2-A, of art. 121, complements the section, by stating that there are reasons of female condition when the crime involves domestic and family violence or contempt or discrimination against women. The penalty for this crime is 12 to 30 years in prison.

Colombia 
Colombia has followed 16 other Latin American countries by passing a law defining and punishing femicide for being a specific crime. On 6 July 2015, the government of Colombia passed a law that legally defines femicide as a crime with 20 to 50 years of jail time. This new law is named after Rosa Elvira Cely, a Colombian woman who was raped and murdered in 2012. Cely's death sparked national outrage, and caused thousands to march down the streets of Bogotá. Her murderer was found guilty, and was sentenced to 48 years in prison. The challenge now becomes implementing the law. Miguel Emilio La Rota, head of public policy and planning at Colombia's attorney general's office, said that the prosecutor's office must change how it investigates femicide. Colombia prosecuted a transgender woman's murder as a femicide for the first time in 2018, sentencing Davinson Stiven Erazo Sánchez to twenty years in a psychiatric center for "aggravated femicide" a year after he killed Anyela Ramos Claros, a transgender woman.

El Salvador 

In El Salvador, an endeavor has been made to create multiple government centers that house many gender-specific services in one place, to cut down on commute time, and to increase the physical safety of women as they seek services such as counseling, child care, and reproductive health. "The first center hopes to provide access to an estimated 162,000 women from the neighboring departments of La Libertad and Sonsonate. Supported by former Chilean president and head of UN Women Michelle Bachelet, the initiative cost $3.2 million, with an additional $20 million loan from the Inter-American Development Bank earmarked for the construction of new sites."

Critics of this action point to the contradictory abortion laws in El Salvador that are some of the harshest in the world: abortion is completely illegal, even to save the life of the mother, or to help a survivor of incest or rape. "Coupled with the judicial system's weaknesses, violence is abetted by the same government that aims to protect and defend. High levels of impunity leave many crimes unresolved or unreported."

Guatemala 
Guatemala has championed the use of femicide as a concept by incorporating the term in its constitution: Decree 22. Lawmakers in this country passed Decree 22 in 2008 that defined Laws Against Femicide and Other Forms of Violence Against Women. These laws include 28 articles about prosecutable types of violence against women. They also created the Office of the Presidential Commission Against Femicide, enforcing the concept in the government and an anti-femicide unit of the National Police. Some results of the laws have proved encouraging, allowing many women to now report violence perpetrated against them. In the first month of 2010, a total of 27,000 women reported violence against them to the state, a large increase in the number of reported crimes. The laws also have helped several people jail their assailants, and have increased the severity of punishments for perpetrators. However, the actual enforcement of the new laws has been varied. Few offenders are ever actually convicted for the specific crime of femicide, and there are only three public prosecution offices in the entire country able to deal with the issue of femicide. In fact, only 127 convictions in 2010 occurred for female violence even though 46,000 cases overall were registered. Also, from 2000 to 2008, 98 percent of all femicide cases have remained in impunity. Some feminists argue that the culture in Guatemala is to blame. They cite that many male judges and other male government officials are sympathetic to the view that men's actions are justified, because they remain within the private sphere of the home. Attorney Romeo Silverio Gonzalez argued for this viewpoint when he stated that the new laws of Decree 22 were unconstitutional. He said that the laws were in contradiction to the private affairs of marriage. Attorney General Claudia Paz countered his viewpoint, ultimately defending the laws by justifying their existence because they protect women's rights. Overall, the legislation of these new laws has helped Guatemala improve the awareness of femicide and reporting of the crime, but enforcement and justice for femicide still have not been achieved. Femicide as the socially tolerated murder of women in Guatemala relies on the presence of systematic impunity, historically rooted gender inequalities, and the pervasive normalization of violence as a social relation.

North America

United States 
Femicide in the United States accounts for the deaths of more than five women daily, and 70% of the total deaths of women among high-income countries. One of the largest predictors of femicide in the United States is the appearance of physical abuse, which was found in 79% of all femicide cases in North Carolina. Gun availability in the United States has also had a substantial effect on femicide, correlating to 67.9% of deaths in a study by Karen D. Stout. Living in neighborhoods with increased poverty, ethnic heterogeneity, and decreased collective efficacy (social cohesion among neighbors) are all found to be linked to increased femicide rates in that area. Also, reporting of female victims of femicide in the US is stymied, due to the assumption that female victims are not an anomaly, but are driven by their perceived vulnerability and passivity.

Canada 
Proper statistics of femicide in Canada can be difficult to come across, since possible acts of femicide are regularly labelled as the killing of a spouse. However, femicide is a widespread violent act that takes place in countries all over the world, and Canada is no exception. In 2019, there was a total of 678 homicides Canada-wide, of these cases 144 of the victims were female. Additionally, the rate at which female victims were killed by a spouse or intimate partner, was over eight times greater than the number of males killed by a spouse or intimate partner.

Historically speaking, less data exists regarding femicide in Canada; however, what is available shows a disproportionate amount of violence and femicide towards Indigenous women. Reports of the last few decades indicate over 600 murders of Indigenous women and girls in Canada. Unfortunately, in many cases, homicidal acts towards Indigenous females often aren't characterized as femicides, indicating that not all victims of femicide are treated in the same framework. Yet the research indicates that certain ethnic groups are at a greater risk for femicide compared to the rest of the population. To understand these statistics in Canada, an intersectional approach must be considered, to recognize the historical and ongoing effects of colonialism that disproportionately target Indigenous peoples within the country. Canada's continued negligence as a state to examine the effects of colonialism on Indigenous peoples has related to the high risk of femicide, and violence for Indigenous women and girls. Failure to acknowledge the deaths of Indigenous women ignores the decades of inequality and injustice that have, and continue to be, perpetuated by colonialism.  

Colonialism produces a sense of dominant authoritative power that allows for the disregard of Indigenous individuals, and in this case, a disregard for the murders of Indigenous females. Indigenous women are reported to be five times more likely to experience violence and death compared with other groups in Canada. These murders are acts of racialized violence, in addition to the gendered violence of femicide. However, more often than not, these murders are regarded as a spousal homicide, rather than femicide, disregarding the violence and oppression Indigenous women face. In the mid-twentieth century, Indigenous women and girls were forced and coerced into undergoing sterilization procedures as an act of femicide, as well as genocide, at fourteen different Indian Hospitals across the state that were federally operated. Sterilization policies were implemented as a way to reduce the size and influence of Indigenous communities, resulting in there being about 1,200 cases of forced or coerced sterilization, that directly targeted the reproductive rights and properties of Indigenous women and girls. Exclusionary politics and legal discrimination throughout the history of Canada, means that the violence faced by Indigenous women and girls has gone unacknowledged, serving to further state-controlled colonial power over Indigenous peoples. The scattered reports of femicide in Canada indicate a lack of understanding of how various acts of gender, race, class, and sexuality all intersect to create the environment of violence Indigenous women are subjected to. While femicide in Canada affects all women, it disproportionately targets the lives of Indigenous women and girls due to historical and ongoing actions of colonialism within the state.  

One prominent instance of femicide occurring in Canada is the 1989 École Polytechnique massacre, which was an antifeminist mass shooting, which killed fourteen women, and injured ten women and four men.

Another example of a femicide attack in Canada is the 2018 Toronto van attack, a vehicle-ramming attack which saw eleven casualties, and fifteen injured. The perpetrator is a self-described "incel", whose goal was to exact revenge on women, after self-perceived social rejection.

United Nations 
In 2013, the United Nations General Assembly updated their policy by recognizing that "gender-related killing of women and girls was criminalized in some countries as 'femicide' or 'feminicide', and has been incorporated as such into national legislation in those countries." Currently, Dr. Dubravka Šimonović is the special rapporteur to the UN. She has been an advocate of anti-femicide policy implementation. She has presented the UN with reports such as "Modalities for the establishment of femicides/gender-related killings". Dr. Šimonović has also proposed a "femicide watch" program to monitor femicide practices across the globe. The goal of Simonovic's academic program is to analyze data on femicide cases, to identify risk factors and any issues in public policy.

Impact of the COVID-19 pandemic 
The rates of femicides has drastically increased during the time of lockdowns due to the COVID-19 pandemic. Around 50,000 women are being murdered every year. This is due to the stay-at-home measures, that have increased the levels of isolation for women and girls. This becomes a life-or-death situation if they are locked in with violent partners or relatives. "The increasing economic instability and unemployment rates worldwide" has led to "heightened violence" for women. Additionally, there has been an increase in calls to domestic violence hotlines in various countries since the lockdown began.

Most countries also "diverted" resources and efforts "from violence against women response to immediate COVID-19 relief".

Prevention 
Femicide, as the word suggests, specifically targets females. However, there are still methods to preventing the act, such as implementing laws that would specifically work to improve the safety of women. For example, harsher punishments for those that partake in the act of murdering a woman solely based on their gender could face a minimum sentence of two hundred and fifty years, discouraging anyone from attempting to do so.

Raising awareness 
Other methods of prevention would be to bring awareness to femicide. Any sort of crime that would be committed against a woman would be interpreted as an act of femicide; from there, people would be more aware of the act, and in turn, help the prevention of femicide.

Training officials 
All officials involved in a gender-based crime should be adequately trained in order to offer support. Service workers, police officers, and legal professionals are some of the groups that should receive extensive training on signs of violence in different social groups, including minorities and migrants. Training is the first step to creating policies to prevent femicide.

Legal solutions 
Today, many females around the world are murdered as a result of intentional murders towards them. Solutions to this problem include making laws and policies for violence against women. Techniques that can be developed include crime prevention policies that are aimed at domestic and family violence. Additionally, countries worldwide should consider developing the status of women in their countries and create laws on gender equality. For example, in Latin America there have been many new laws to label the murders of women as femicide or feminicide. Femicide is defined as the killing of a woman by a man based on misogyny. At the same time, feminicide goes beyond this definition and implicates the state's complicity in maintaining violence against women. These changes have been made due to global human rights norms, like the 1994 Inter-American Convention on the Prevention and the Eradication of Violence against Women, which expresses that gender violence is the state's responsibility. Nevertheless, these international norms are not regulated. They do not implement how a state should exercise new laws and policies to enforce violence against women.

Some countries have passed laws belonging to femicide or crimes labeled as feminicides. In Mexico and Nicaragua, female activists became involved in legal activism so their state could increase responsibility for female violence. During a small political opportunity with a strict regime in Nicaragua, Femicide resulted from the countries' responsiveness to feminist demands. In Mexico, feminicides became successful because of good campaigning by local feminists connected to national arenas and through the intervention of feminist federal legislators. A known Mexican female activist, Marcela Lagarde, saw the rise of women being murdered in Mexico and demanded that the state take responsibility for the killings. She brought in the concept of femicide (the murder of females), which quickly spread to Latin America, and as of 2017, femicide and feminicide became crimes in 18 countries.

Film 
A 2019 German documentary by Karen Naundorf with the title Frauen gegen Männer-Gewalt or in the French version La révolte des femmes (English: Women Against Male Violence) shows the effect of violence and murder targeted towards women in Argentina. The film was made freely available to watch on arte.tv, from 25 October 2019 to 8 October 2022.

See also 

 Antifeminism
 Gendercide
 Genocidal rape
 Incel
 Inquisition
 Magic and religion
 Witchcraft
 Witch-hunt
 Witch trials in the early modern period
 Salem witch trials
 Torture of witches
 European witchcraft
 Modern witch-hunts
 Androcide, the killing of men
 Feminism
 Gender and religion
 Gender apartheid
 Honor killing
 Honour killing in Pakistan
 Hypermasculinity
 Manosphere
 Matriarchy
 Misandry – hatred of, contempt for, or prejudice against men
 Misogyny – hatred of, contempt for, or prejudice against women
 Misogynist terrorism
 Missing women, a term which is used in reference to a statistical phenomenon which was first identified in Asia (as opposed to the disappearance of individuals)
 Missing and murdered Indigenous women
 Patriarchy
 Raptio
 Sexism
 Violence against men
 Violence against women
 War rape
 Wartime sexual violence
 Women and religion

References

External links 
 "Female Genocide in India" in Intersections: Gender and Sexuality in Asia and the Pacific Issue 22, October 2009

°.°

Killings by type
 
1976 neologisms